Héctor Luis Gradassi (6 March 1933 in Cordoba - 4 February 2003) was an Argentine racing driver.

Career
Gradassi made his professional racing debut in 1964.  He first entered the Turismo Carretera in 1967, winning the race.  He won the Turismo Carretera in 1972, 1974, 1975 and 1976.

In his career Gradassi participated in 244 races, winning 49 of them.

References

External links 
 

1933 births
2003 deaths
Argentine racing drivers
Turismo Carretera drivers
World Sportscar Championship drivers